Saparmyrat Türkmenbaşy adyndaky şäheri ("City named for Saparmurat Turkmenbashy"), formerly known as the town of Oktyabr in Turkmen and Oktyabrsk in Russian, is a city in and administrative center of Saparmyrat Türkmenbaşy adyndaky District, Daşoguz Province, Turkmenistan.

Etymology
The city was renamed in honor of then-President Saparmurat Niyazov on 5 May 1993. The former name, Oktyabr/Oktyabrsk, paid homage to the "Great October Revolution", known more commonly in the West as the Russian Revolution.

References

Populated places in Daşoguz Region